Gaston Karel Mathilde Burssens (18 February 1896 – 29 January 1965) was a Belgian Expressionist poet. He studied at the Dutch-language Von Bissing University in Ghent during the German occupation of Belgium during World War I.

Biography
Like that of Paul van Ostaijen, during the 1920s his work evolved from humanitarian expressionism towards a more organic expressionism – upon which his poetry stayed focused on musicality. Van Ostaijen's not earlier published poems were published posthumously by Burssens.

Burssens received the 'Driejaarlijkse Prijs voor Poëzie''', a reward for poetry granted every third year, for 1950–52, and once again for 1956–58.

Works

 1918 Verzen 1919 De Yadefluit 1920 Liederen uit de stad en uit de sel 1924 Piano 1926 Enzovoort 1930 Klemmen voor zangvogels 1933 Paul van Ostaijen zoals hij was en is  1935 French en andere cancan 1941 De eeuw van Pericles 1943 Elegie -- Floris Jespers 1945 Fabula rasa 1946 12 niggersongs 1952 Pegasos van Troja -- Boy 1954 Ode 1956 Floris Jespers -- Paul van Ostaijen -- Het neusje van de inktvis 1956 Debuut met Plagiaat 1958 Adieu 1961 Posthume verzen 1981 Verzameld proza 2005 Alles is mogelijk in een gedicht. Verzamelde verzen 1914-1965''

References

External links 

1896 births
1965 deaths
Expressionist poets
Flemish poets
Flemish activists
20th-century Belgian poets
Belgian male poets
20th-century Belgian male writers